Minggang East railway station is a railway station of Beijing–Guangzhou–Shenzhen–Hong Kong High-Speed Railway located in Minggang, Pingqiao District, Xinyang, Henan Province, People's Republic of China.

See also
Minggang railway station

Railway stations in Henan
Stations on the Shijiazhuang–Wuhan High-Speed Railway
Stations on the Beijing–Guangzhou–Shenzhen–Hong Kong High-Speed Railway
Railway stations in China opened in 2012